Hatem El Mekki (May 16, 1918 – September 23, 2003) was a prominent Tunisian painter. He was born in Batavia, Dutch East Indies, and died in Carthage in 2003.

From 1957, his artwork appeared on a large number of postage stamps of Tunisia. El Mekki drew the head of the coin used in Tunisia from 1988 to 1990.

1918 births
2003 deaths
20th-century Tunisian painters
People from Batavia, Dutch East Indies
Indonesian emigrants
Immigrants to Tunisia